The Chicago Tigers are an American professional Twenty20 franchise cricket team that compete in Minor League Cricket (MiLC). The team is based in Chicago, Illinois. It was formed in 2022 as part of 3 new teams to play in the 2022 season of Minor League Cricket. The franchise is owned by Raiders Unlimited.

The team's home ground is Hanover Park, located near Chicago, Illinois. Ex-South African cricketers Calvin Savage and Marques Ackerman helm captaincy and vice-captaincy duties respectively.

Saad Ali and Sami Sohail currently top the bowling and batting leaderboards with 405 runs and 22 wickets respectively.

Franchise history

Background 
Talks of an American Twenty20 league formed in November 2018, before USA Cricket became the new governing body of cricket in the United States. In May 2021, USA Cricket announced that they had accepted a bid by American Cricket Enterprises (ACE) for a US$1 billion investment covering the league and other investments benefiting the U.S. national teams.

In an Annual General Meeting on February 21, 2020, it was announced that USA Cricket was planning to launch Major League Cricket in 2021 and Minor League Cricket that summer, but it was delayed due to the COVID-19 pandemic and due to the lack of high-quality cricket stadiums in the USA. Major League Cricket was pushed to a summer-2023 launch and Minor League Cricket was pushed back to July 31, 2021.

In 2020, MLC launched the Chicago Catchers, the predecessor cricket team to the Chicago Tigers. The Catchers performed poorly during the inaugural season of Minor League Cricket, which thus forced MLC to terminate the Catchers after the season ended amid internal issues within the franchise.

Following the termination of the Catchers, MLC announced the formation of the Tigers in May 2022, ahead of the 2022 Minor League Cricket season draft. It was later announced that the Tigers was owned by Raiders Unlimited, which was owned by sports enthusiast and business entrepreneur Vishal Shah.

2022 season 

Ahead of the 2022 season, Major League Cricket announced that the draft for that season would take place on May 12. Ahead of the official season, it was announced that Calvin Savage and Marques Ackerman would helm captaincy and vice-captaincy duties throughout the season.

Throughout the season, the Tigers lost to the Strikers and Lashings once, won once and lost once against the Athletics, Mustangs, and Americans, won once against the Surf Riders, and won twice against the Blasters. The Tigers finished second in their group, and advanced to the quarter-finals, wherein they lost to the Strikers 2-1 in a best-of-three series.

Current squad 
 Players with international caps are listed in bold.
  denotes a player who is currently unavailable for selection.
  denotes a player who is unavailable for rest of the season

Statistics

Most runs 

Source: CricClubs, Last updated: 9 January 2023

Most wickets 

Source: CricClubs, Last updated: 9 January 2023

See also 
 Major League Cricket
 Minor League Cricket
 2021 Minor League Cricket season
 2021 Minor League Cricket season final
 Minor League Cricket teams

References 

Minor League Cricket teams
Cricket teams in Chicago
Cricket clubs established in 2022
2022 establishments in Illinois